The Cambrian Warrior Formation is a mapped limestone bedrock unit in Pennsylvania.

Description
The Warrior Formation is described by Berg and others as gray, thin- to medium-bedded, fossiliferous, cyclic limestone bearing stromatolites, interbedded with shale, siltstone, and sandstone.

Fossils

 Trilobites, including Crepicephalus, Cedaria, Llanoaspidella, and Blountia kindlei Resser, Coosella brevis Resser, Kingstonia ara (Walcott), K. kindlei Resser, and other Kingstonia species, Menomonia avitas (Walcott), Blountia, Modocia, Lonchocephalus, Genevievella, Pemphigaspis.
 Brachiopods
 Cryptozoon, a type of trace fossil
 Stromatolites

Notable Exposures
 Type section: Warrior Run, 1 mile east of Williamsburg, Blair County
 Warrior Creek (formerly Warriorsmark Creek), east of Warriors Mark, Huntingdon County
 Section near Waddle, Pennsylvania.

Age
Relative age dating places the Warrior Formation in the middle to late Cambrian.

References

Cambrian geology of Pennsylvania
Limestone
Cambrian southern paleotemperate deposits